The 2008 NASCAR Nationwide Series began on February 16 at Daytona International Speedway with the Camping World 300, and ended on November 15 at Homestead-Miami Speedway with the Ford 300. This was the first season in which NASCAR's second-tier series was known as the Nationwide Series, ending the 26-year sponsorship by Anheuser-Busch's Busch Beer. The seven-year agreement gives Nationwide Insurance the exclusive rights to tie its brand to NASCAR's second most popular racing series.

Schedule 

The following table shows the 2008 schedule published by NASCAR.

♣ — Race ran at night, or started in the late afternoon and finished at night.

2008 team chart

Complete schedule

Part-time schedule

Television 

The 2008 TV schedule followed the same format as 2007, with most races broadcast on ESPN2 and six races broadcast on ABC when ESPN2 broadcast larger sporting events. All races were to be shown live on free-to-air TV in Australia on Ten HD. In South America, SPEED broadcast the entire season.

2008 season races

Camping World 300 

The Camping World 300 presented by Chevrolet was held February 16 at Daytona International Speedway. Tony Stewart won the pole and then went on to win the race. Stewart became the first driver to win the season opening Nationwide Series race at Daytona from the pole. Johnny Sauter, Cale Gale, Kertus Davis and David Gilliland all received 25-point penalties for various infractions.

Did not qualify: Danny O'Quinn Jr. (#56), Morgan Shepherd (#89), Larry Gunselman (#91), Kenny Wallace (#36), Kevin Lepage (#61), Joe Nemechek (#87), Donnie Neuenberger (#52), Brett Rowe (#05), Mike Harmon (#84), Kertus Davis (#0).

NOTE: On February 20 NASCAR announced that seven Nationwide teams had been penalized due to rule violations during Speedweeks at Daytona. The most notable was Dale Earnhardt Jr.'s #5 team whose crew chief was fined $25,000 and suspended for the next six Nationwide Series events until April 9. Earnhardt Jr. was penalized with the loss of 50 driver points, while car owner Rick Hendrick was penalized 50 owner points. An altered rear spoiler was found during post-practice template inspection which enhanced the aerodynamic performance on the car. On March 4 it was announced that some teams had their penalties upheld and some rescinded by the National Stock Car Racing Commission. Rusty Wallace, Inc. had 3 penalties rescinded on the #64 car driven by David Stremme. The commission also amended 2 of 3 penalties issued to Richardson-Hass Motorsports' #14 car driven by David Gilliland. The commission also reduced a fine against Kevin Harvick, Inc. #77 crew chief Charles Wilson from $15,000 to $5,000 and also reduced a suspension from the next 6 races to only 4 races. The commission opted to uphold penalties against the JD Motorsports #0 car driven by Kertus Davis. The commission also decided to amend 2 of 3 penalties issued to the Phoenix Racing #1 car driven by Johnny Sauter.

Stater Brothers 300 

The Stater Brothers 300 was held on Monday, February 25 due to rain at the newly renamed Auto Club Speedway of Southern California (previously California Speedway) in Fontana, California. Jeff Burton won the pole due to qualifying being canceled after being rained out. The race was scheduled to be held on the 23rd, but water seeping onto the track surface prevented this, and it was then scheduled to be held after Sunday's Auto Club 500. More rain postponed that, and again also delayed the Nationwide race to Monday, an hour after the completion of the Sprint Cup Series race. Tony Stewart dominated most of the day leading 139 of 150 laps with fellow Toyota driver David Reutimann sitting in 2nd for much of the race.

Did not qualify: None, only 43 entries.

NOTE: Eric Norris driver of the #14 Carl A. Haas Motorsports entry withdrew, making only 42 starters.

Sam's Town 300 

The Sam's Town 300 was held on March 1 at Las Vegas Motor Speedway. Brian Vickers won the pole. Just like the previous two weeks, Tony Stewart dominated the race. However, his chance to score his first Vegas win were dashed on lap 138 when he spun while alongside David Reutimann. Hometown hero Kyle Busch had to start in the back but worked his way through the field and took the lead after a lap 63 pit stop. However, his day would end on lap 103 when he cut a right front tire. Another strong car, the #29 of Jeff Burton, worked his way through the field following an unscheduled pit stop. However, on lap 158, his engine blew while challenging Mark Martin for the lead. Eventually, after 12 cautions, the race would turn to three drivers: Martin who was seeking to return to Victory Lane, Carl Edwards who was looking to keep his momentum going after his Cup win in Fontana, and Brad Keselowski, trying to make a name for himself and become the first non Cup Series driver to win since Aric Almirola last year. On lap 195 while Edwards and Keselowski were going side by side at the start/finish line, Martin tapped Edwards in the rear, spinning him into Keselowski and sending the race into overtime. Martin would easily fend off former teammate Greg Biffle for his first Nationwide Series win of the season. Martin later apologized to both Edwards and Keselowski in victory lane.

Did not qualify: Sam Hornish Jr. (#12), Mike Harmon (#84).

Nicorette 300 

The Nicorette 300 was held on March 10 at Atlanta Motor Speedway. Jeff Burton won the pole. As usual, the race would be dominated by Sprint Cup Series points leader Kyle Busch. Busch hoped to make history by being the points leader in all three of NASCAR's top racing circuits. He would do so to an extent, leading 153 laps. However, Busch's hopes would be derailed by a flat tire while entering turn 1. His misfortune would open the door for other drivers such as Matt Kenseth, Kevin Harvick, and polesitter Burton. David Ragan would take the top spot after pit stops under the caution for Busch's crash. However, Burton and Kenseth took first and second on lap 177. Things would stay this way for 9 laps until Kenseth made the pass for the lead. The main highlight of the race came on lap 189. While exiting turn two, Dale Earnhardt Jr. attempted to pass Eric McClure. However, McClure spun in front of Dale Jr., turning him into the wall and into the path of rookie Bryan Clauson, who hit McClure's car as it hit the wall, lifting it off the ground. This brought out a red flag lasting several minutes. Although Kenseth led with three to go, debris from Ragan's car brought out a green-white-checkered finish to lap 198, with Kenseth holding off Harvick for his first win of the season.

Did not qualify: None, only 43 entries.

Sharpie Mini 300 

The Sharpie Mini 300 was held March 15 at Bristol Motor Speedway. Scott Wimmer won the pole. Unlike other races, Kyle Busch would not dominate this one, as he was taken out by a spinning Martin Truex Jr. on lap 13. 2006 Champion Kevin Harvick had one of the best cars all day but fell out of contention after his tire changer failed to secure a lugnut on lap 102. Clint Bowyer dominated the race, leading for 119 laps. However, the move of the race came on lap 164 when Bowyer and eight others stayed out on the track as rain began to hit the track. Up to that point, Bowyer had been fending off a charging Kasey Kahne for the past 40 laps before the rains hit. The cars would be pulled onto pit road on lap 171 and Bowyer would be declared the winner after a 47-minute rain delay.

Did not qualify: Danny O'Quinn Jr. (#56), Sam Hornish Jr. (#12).

Pepsi 300 

The Pepsi 300 was held on March 22 at Nashville Superspeedway. Kyle Busch won the pole. As usual, Busch would dominate the race, leading 125 laps. However, his bad luck would continue as he spun coming out of turn 4. This move handed the lead to Bristol winner Clint Bowyer who held the top spot until teammate Scott Wimmer passed him with 20 to go. Wimmer would hang on to snap his 57 race winless streak (since Pikes Peak in 2003) and become the first non-Sprint Cup driver to win a race in 2008. This was also Wimmer's 6th and final career victory in the Series.

Did not qualify: Jerick Johnson (#57), Rubén Pardo (#36).

O'Reilly 300 

The O'Reilly 300 was held on April 5 at Texas Motor Speedway in Fort Worth, Texas. Kevin Harvick started from the pole after qualifying was rained out.  Kyle Busch won the race, it was his first Nationwide Series win of the 2008 season. Busch led four times for 126 laps, including the final 43 laps of the race. Kevin Harvick who led 55 laps broke an axle on his first pit stop and lost 21 laps while his crew replaced it, he finished 34th. Tony Stewart went down a lap with an unscheduled pit stop on lap 71 after cutting his right rear tire. He had run over a lug nut on pit road during a green-flag pit stop on lap 56. Only 14 cars finished on the lead lap.

Failed to make race as qualifying was canceled due to rain: Donnie Neuenberger (#0).

Bashas' Supermarkets 200 

The Bashas' Supermarkets 200 was held on April 11 at Phoenix International Raceway. Kyle Busch won the pole. And as usual, the race would be utterly dominated by  Busch. Busch hoped to make history by being the points leader in all three of NASCAR's top racing circuits.

Did not qualify: None, only 43 entries.

Corona México 200 

The Corona México 200 was held on April 20 at Autódromo Hermanos Rodríguez in Mexico City, Mexico. Colin Braun won the pole.  Kyle Busch won the race after passing Scott Pruett with nine laps remaining. Busch warned over his radio that Pruett would get dumped if he kept blocking him, a reference to the 2007 race.  The win was Busch's first on a road course and his third straight Nationwide Series win. Scott Pruett led 36 of the 80 laps and wound up finishing third.  Road course veteran Boris Said struggled for most of the day and was spun out by Marcos Ambrose with 28 laps remaining. The damage took Said out of the race, and he angrily pointed at Ambrose. Boris commented that "He either made a mistake or he's incredibly stupid, and I don't think he'd make a big mistake like that. I wouldn't expect it from him. "I'm not going to get mad, I'm just going to get even." Ambrose finished the day in second place, his best finish in the Nationwide Series. This was the last race held at Autódromo Hermanos Rodríguez for the NASCAR Nationwide Series.

Did not qualify: Brett Rowe (#05), Morgan Shepherd (#89), Derrike Cope (#49), Joe Fox (#0).

Aaron's 312 

The Aaron's 312 was held on April 26 at Talladega Superspeedway, in Talladega, Alabama. Tony Stewart won the pole and later went on to win the race.  Tony Stewart and Dale Earnhardt Jr. dominated much of the race running in first and second place respectively. 2007 IndyCar Series champion Dario Franchitti blew a tire on lap 11 and spun around onto the apron in Turn 3 into the path of the #91 car driven by Larry Gunselman who slammed into the driver's side of Franchitti's car. Franchitti suffered a fractured left ankle and minor contusions from the hard impact,  the injury would sideline him for 5 Sprint Cup Series races. The big wreck (often dubbed "The Big One") occurred on lap 71 when Kevin Lepage was coming off pit road and merged immediately in front of the lead pack traffic. Lepage was only running around 115 mph when the wreck happened compared to the leaders who were running 191 mph. Several contenders were taken out including Kyle Busch and Carl Edwards. The race was red flagged to clean up debris. Around 16 cars were involved in the wreck, during the race several drivers were penalized for blending onto the track too early, instead of blending at Turn 2. Lepage publicly apologized for the incident the next day saying "I made a huge driver error by blending onto the racetrack in the wrong area. This caused a multi-car accident and changed the outcome of the race for many teams." Dale Earnhardt Jr. waited to make a last lap pass down the backstretch on Stewart but didn't have any drafting help, Dale would cross the finish line in sixth position.

Did not qualify: None, only 43 cars.

Lipton Tea 250 

The Lipton Tea 250 was held on May 2 at Richmond International Raceway in Richmond, Virginia. Kasey Kahne won the pole. The race, like the previous year's featured pit strategy as a key factor. Bryan Clauson (#41) spun out on lap 247 with only 3 laps left bringing out the eighth and final caution. Virginia native Denny Hamlin who was leading at the time of Clauson's spin made a pit stop during the caution for four fresh Goodyear tires. On the restart of a green-white-checkered finish Hamlin blew past Carl Edwards and race leader Kevin Harvick who both opted to not pit during the late race caution. It was Denny Hamlin's sixth Nationwide Series career win and also Joe Gibbs Racing's seventh Nationwide Series victory in 2008. Kyle Busch came from a lap down to finish third, even after Steve Wallace got into Busch on the final lap.  Kyle retaliated at Wallace after the checkered flag and spun out fourth-place finisher David Ragan in the process. Busch and Wallace had a small altercation on pit road after the race. Wallace who was seated in his #66 Chevy grabbed Busch's helmet when Busch confronted him about the incident.

Did not qualify: Chad Beahr (#57).

Diamond Hill Plywood 200 

The Diamond Hill Plywood 200 was held on May 9 at Darlington Raceway in Darlington, South Carolina. Carl Edwards won the pole. Denny Hamlin who won the previous race and was the fastest in the two final practice sessions hit the wall on his qualifying lap and failed to qualify. Carl Edwards, who won the pole, chose to start on the outside of Bowyer, the second-place qualifier. But scraped the wall while racing Bowyer on the opening lap. Edwards' bad luck would continue when on lap 2 his #60 Ford blew the right-front tire and smacked the Turn 3 wall causing his race to end early. Matt Kenseth led Tony Stewart by more than two seconds with 46 laps left in the race but Kenseth made a pit stop on lap 121, complaining that his wheels were chattering. The crew put on four tires and sent Kenseth back on the track, but Kenseth wrecked in Turn 4 on lap 128 trying to catch the first car one lap down. The race was red flagged with 19 laps remaining as track crews cleaned up after Kenseth's wreck. David Ragan spun on lap 138 and hit the wall bringing out the seventh caution. Mark Martin's engine stalled on the restart with three laps remaining due to fuel pickup problems, triggering a six-car wreck, the race was red flagged again for cleanup. Stewart led the field to the restart of a green-white-checker finish on lap 148. Tony Stewart pulled away from Clint Bowyer and went on to win his first race at Darlington Raceway. It was Stewart's fourth victory in the 2008 Nationwide Series, and the sixth of his career. It marked the eighth win for Joe Gibbs Racing in the 2008 Nationwide Series, and the fourth consecutive victory for the team's #20 car.

Did not qualify: Brett Rowe (#05), Denny Hamlin (#18).

Carquest Auto Parts 300 

The Carquest Auto Parts 300 was held on May 24 at Lowe's Motor Speedway in Concord, North Carolina, a suburb of Charlotte. Brian Vickers won the pole. Kyle Busch driving for Braun Racing won the race, ending the four-race winning streak of Joe Gibbs Racing. During the final caution (#88) Brad Keselowski tapped (#20) Denny Hamlin's bumper as the cars circled the track behind the pace car.  Keselowski was upset with the way Hamlin had raced him. Hamlin retaliated by turning right into Keselowski's Chevrolet, damaging the left-front fender.  The move by Hamlin upset Dale Earnhardt Jr. owner of the #88 and driver of the #83 for this race only, who was running fourth right behind the #88.  While still under caution Earnhardt drove up and tapped Hamlin's bumper. After the incident an angry post-race confrontation erupted between the #88 JR Motorsports crew and the #20 Gibbs crew. The confrontation resulted in three members of the JR Motorsports crew being fined by NASCAR and one member was also suspended for one race.

Did not qualify: Burney Lamar (#37),  Johnny Chapman (#90), Brett Rowe (#05).

Heluva Good! 200 

The Heluva Good! 200 was held on May 31 at Dover International Speedway in Dover, Delaware. Carl Edwards won the pole. The start of the race was delayed for three hours due to heavy rain. This race marked the much anticipated debut of 18-year-old driving sensation Joey Logano driving the #20 GameStop Toyota for Joe Gibbs Racing. Dario Franchitti made his first start since breaking his ankle in the Aaron's 312 at Talladega. Kyle Busch driving for Braun Racing led 68 laps, but various problems dropped him back in the field. Busch made a pit stop on Lap 105 while leading, but contact between his #32 Toyota and Brad Keselowski's #88 Chevrolet forced both cars back to pit road under the third caution of the race. Busch had rallied back to the eight position when on Lap 169, Braun Racing teammate Jason Leffler lost control of his car and knocked Busch into the Turn 2 wall. From then on, Denny Hamlin would hold off polesitter Edwards and David Stremme over the final 28 laps to win the race. It would be Joe Gibbs Racing's ninth victory in the 2008 Nationwide Series. Joey Logano was able to keep his car in one piece and finish sixth, despite making contact with Kasey Kahne on pit road early in the race.

Did not qualify: Dominick Casola (#02).

Federated Auto Parts 300 

The Federated Auto Parts 300 presented by Dollar General was held on June 7 at Nashville Superspeedway in Lebanon, Tennessee. The 18-year-old phenom Joey Logano won the pole in his second ever start. Logano led early for 60 laps. Though Logano, Clint Bowyer, David Reutimann, and others headed for the pits on Lap 79, Brad Keselowski stayed out. This move put Keselowski on a different fuel strategy, pitting late with 41 laps to go instead of pitting with the rest of the field with 77 to go. On lap 89 Logano was taken out of contention during a four wide race through Turn 4. His #20 Toyota was clipped by Greg Biffle's Ford, turning him sideways into Busch's car before shooting up the track and into the outside wall. Late in the race fuel became an issue as Reutimann appeared to have his second Nationwide career win in the bag while being pursued by Bowyer and Kyle Busch. However, a caution brought out by a spinning Brad Teague ruined Reutimann's hopes of victory, as he was passed by Bowyer and Busch on the restart with 8 laps to go. As Bowyer made contact with Reutimann, Keselowski made his move to the inside of Bowyer, taking the lead and eventually his first ever win in his 49th start.

Did not qualify: Brian Keselowski (#92),  Brett Rowe (#05), Ryan Hackett (#76).

Meijer 300 

The Meijer 300 presented by Oreo was held on June 14 at Kentucky Speedway in Sparta, Kentucky. 18-year-old phenom Joey Logano won the pole. From the drop of the green, Logano and teammate Kyle Busch dominated the race, leading a combined total of 116 laps, with Busch leading a race high 85 laps. It would be the Logano and Busch show until lap 163 when Busch spun coming out of turn 2. From there, Logano went on to win the race, becoming the youngest winner in the NASCAR Nationwide Series at only 18 years and 21 days, beating Casey Atwood's long standing record of 18 years, 10 months and 9 days set when he won at Milwaukee in 1999.

Did not qualify: Danny O'Quinn Jr. (#05).

Camping World RV Rental 250 

The Camping World RV Rental 250 was held on June 21 at The Milwaukee Mile in West Allis, Wisconsin. The defending 2007 NASCAR Busch Series champion, Carl Edwards, won the event, end his 36-winless streak drought. Edwards had started in the back, due to not making to the track for qualifying. Last week's winner, Joey Logano finished a hard strong 2nd, while points leader, Clint Bowyer finished 3rd.

Did not qualify: Rubén Pardo (#05), Kenny Hendrick (#31), Andy Ponstein (#02), Chad Chaffin (#55), Mike Harmon (#84).

Camping World RV Sales 200 presented by RVs.com 

The Camping World RV Sales 200 presented by RVs.com was held on June 28 at the New Hampshire Motor Speedway in Loudon, New Hampshire. Landon Cassill won the pole but started from the rear due to an engine change. Cassill gained 28 positions but on Lap 47 a tap from Bobby Hamilton Jr. sent his #5 Chevy into the wall and ended his day. He finished 34th. Tony Stewart who started 8th dominated the race in the #20 Joe Gibbs Racing Toyota leading 75 of the 200 laps. Fellow Joe Gibbs driver Kyle Busch also fared well starting 4th and leading 63 laps eventually finishing 3rd. David Reutimann led 25 laps and managed a 7th-place finish in his Michael Waltrip Racing Toyota. Nationwide points leader Clint Bowyer started 2nd and led 36 laps before finishing 9th. Greg Biffle crashed on the last lap causing the race to end under caution with Stewart, Hamlin and Busch claiming the top 3 spots. The race marked the first 1–2–3 Nationwide Series finish for Toyota. Stewart's win was the eighth of the season for the #20 Joe Gibbs Racing Toyota.

Did not qualify: Justin Hobgood (#91).

NOTE: NASCAR announced on July 2 that Chad Walter crew chief for the #5 JR Motorsports team had been fined due to a rule violation during the Nationwide Series event at New Hampshire on June 28. Walter was fined $10,000 and placed on NASCAR probation until December 31 due to the use of improper language by a crew chief during a televised interview of the race. After a wreck between Bobby Hamilton Jr. and the #5 driver Landon Cassill, Walter said "Shit happens" in an interview with an ESPN reporter. Rick Hendrick, listed owner of the #5 Chevy, was penalized with the loss of 25 Nationwide Series car owner points while Cassill was docked 25 Nationwide Series driver points.

Winn-Dixie 250 

The Winn-Dixie 250 powered by Coca-Cola was held on July 4 at Daytona International Speedway in Daytona Beach, Florida. Denny Hamlin won the race.

Did not qualify: Justin Hobgood (#91), Justin Ashburn (#05).

NOTE: Race extended 5 laps / 12.5 miles due to a green-white-checker finish.

Dollar General 300 

The Dollar General 300 powered by Coca-Cola was held on July 11 at Chicagoland Speedway in Joliet, Illinois. Sprint Cup Series regular David Reutimann won the pole. Denny Hamlin started the race in 41st position after a mechanical problem in qualifying forced him to start from the rear. Hamlin rallied back and finished 2nd having one of the fastest cars near the end of the race. Tony Stewart missed a shift at the start of the race causing Kevin Harvick to slam into the back of Stewart's car taking both drivers out of contention for the win. The first caution flag flew on Lap 56 when Jason Leffler spun into the infield grass during green flag pit stops. The second caution was brought out on Lap 63 when Matt Kenseth's #17 car spun coming off Turn 4. The third and final caution came out for debris from Tony Stewart's #20 car. The race stayed green setting a record average speed, Kyle Busch had a 3.120 second advantage over Denny Hamlin when he took the checkered flag. The win was Busch's fifth 2008 Nationwide victory, and the 16th of his career. The win gave Joe Gibbs Racing a series record tying 13 wins in a single season, matching in 20 races the 13 wins Richard Childress Racing scored in all of 2007.

Did not qualify: Jeremy Clements (#50), Robert Richardson Jr. (#23), Kevin Lepage (#43), Brian Keselowski (#92), Morgan Shepherd (#89), Chad Blount (#36), Justin Hobgood (#91).

Missouri-Illinois Dodge Dealers 250 

The Missouri-Illinois Dodge Dealers 250  was held on July 19 at Gateway International Raceway in Madison, Illinois. Carl Edwards was the winner.

Did not qualify: Brad Baker (#37), Andy Ponstein (#02), Kevin Lepage (#84), Nick Tucker (#57).

Kroger 200

The Kroger 200 was held on July 26 at O'Reilly Raceway Park in Clermont, Indiana. Kyle Busch was the overall winner.

Did not qualify: Charles Lewandoski (#36), Andy Ponstein (#02), Chad Beahr (#57).

NAPA Auto Parts 200 presented by Dodge

The NAPA Auto Parts 200 was held on August 2 at the Circuit Gilles Villeneuve. The race became the first NASCAR race in history to be run in the rain, as cars were fitted with rain tires and windshield-wipers. Despite these advantages, the race was eventually red-flagged and was soon called after 48 of the scheduled 74 laps. Although Marcos Ambrose dominated the race in the #59 for a second-straight year, he got penalized for speeding on pit road which gave the lead to Canadian Ron Fellows. Fellows held it to the end and was declared the winner, his final NASCAR Nationwide Series win of his racing career, plus his final win in any form of division in NASCAR. During an earlier caution for rain, Carl Edwards was seen using what looked to be a floor mop to try and clean his windshield; he was given it to combat the windshield fogging up on the inside.

Did not qualify: Kevin O'Connell (09).

Zippo 200 at the Glen

The Zippo 200 was held on August 9 at Watkins Glen International. Marcos Ambrose was the overall winner, becoming the first Australian winner in NASCAR history. Dario Franchitti became the first Scottish driver to win a NASCAR pole position and the first Scotsman to lead laps in a NASCAR Nationwide Series race, finishing 5th. 

Did not qualify: Burney Lamar (#05), Kenny Hendrick (#31), Derrike Cope (#49), Larry Gunselman (#0), Alex Garcia (#98).

Carfax 250

The Carfax 250 was held on August 16 at Michigan International Speedway.

Did not qualify: Larry Gunselman (#0), Kertus Davis (#49), Michael Guerity (#57), Jeremy Clements (#50).

Food City 250

The Food City 250 was held on August 22 at Bristol Motor Speedway. Brad Keselowski was the overall winner.

Did not qualify: Kertus Davis (#49), John Wes Townley (#09), Morgan Shepherd (#89), Kenny Hendrick (#34), Nick Tucker (#78), Johnny Chapman (#90), Brian Keselowski (#92), Ryan Hackett (#76), Mike Harmon (#84).

Camping World RV Service 300 presented by Coleman

The Camping World RV Service 300 was held on August 30 at Auto Club Speedway. Kyle Busch was the overall winner.

Did not qualify: Mike Harmon (#84).

Emerson Radio 250

The Emerson Radio 250 was held on September 7 at Richmond International Raceway. Carl Edwards was the overall winner.

Did not qualify: Larry Gunselman (#0).

Camping World RV Sales 200

The Camping World RV Sales 200 was held September 20 at Dover International Speedway. Kyle Busch won the pole and then went on to win the race.

Did not qualify: None, only 43 entries.

Kansas Lottery 300
The Kansas Lottery 300 was held on September 27 at Kansas Speedway in Kansas City, Kansas. Denny Hamlin is the race winner.

Did not qualify: Johnny Chapman (#90), Brian Keselowski (#92), Mike Harmon (#84), Larry Gunselman (#0).

Dollar General 300
The Dollar General 300 was held on October 10 at Lowe's Motor Speedway in Concord, North Carolina. Kyle Busch was the winner.

Did not qualify: Mark Green (#70), Kertus Davis (#49), Kenny Hendrick (#93), Andy Ponstein (#02), Morgan Shepherd (#89), Johnny Sauter (#78), Josh Wise (#00), Larry Gunselman (#0), Justin Marks (#03), Robert Richardson Jr. (#23).

Kroger on Track for the Cure 250 presented by the Southern Dodge Dealers
The Kroger On Track for the Cure 250 was held on October 25 at Memphis Motorsports Park in Millington, Tennessee, a suburb of Memphis. Carl Edwards was the winner. Kenny Wallace suffered a 100-point penalty for unapproved adjustments found in his car during post-race inspection.

Did not qualify: Johnny Chapman (#90), Stanton Barrett (#30), John Wes Townley (#09), Larry Gunselman (#0), Travis Kittleson (#56), Tim Weaver (#75).

O'Reilly Challenge
The O'Reilly Challenge was held on November 1 at Texas Motor Speedway in Fort Worth, Texas, a suburb of Dallas. Kyle Busch was the winner.

Did not qualify: Morgan Shepherd (#89), Burney Lamar (#05), John Wes Townley (#09), Kenny Hendrick (#31), Justin Hobgood (#91), Johnny Sauter (#78), Mike Harmon (#84).

Hefty Odor Block 200
The Hefty Odor Block 200 was held on November 8 at Phoenix International Raceway in Avondale, Arizona, a suburb of Phoenix. Carl Edwards was the winner.

Did not qualify: Kevin Lepage (#73), Stan Silva Jr. (#65), Derrike Cope (#82), Danny Efland (#0), Kenny Hendrick (#31), Jason White (#78), Morgan Shepherd (#89).

Ford 300

The Ford 300 was held November 15 at Homestead-Miami Speedway in Homestead, Florida, a suburb of Miami. Edwards wins the race. Clint Bowyer wins his first championship.

Did not qualify: Stanton Barrett (#30), Casey Atwood (#05), Danny O'Quinn Jr. (#35), Mark Green (#70), Robert Richardson Jr., John Wes Townley (#09), Kevin Lepage (#73), Morgan Shepherd (#89), Derrike Cope (#78).

Final standings

Drivers 
The top 10

Full Drivers' Championship
(key) Bold – Pole position awarded by time. Italics – Pole position set by owner's points. * – Most laps led.

Declaring for points in one series: Rules change for 2011
This was the third-to-last season where Cup Series drivers could run for points in another series. NASCAR implemented this change after Cup drivers were winning the Busch/Nationwide championships over the series regulars for 5 years straight (2006-2010). If the change had been implemented for the 2008 season, Keselowski would have been the champion. The rest of the top 10 in the standings would have been Mike Bliss in 2nd, Mike Wallace, Leffler, Ambrose, David Stremme (who finished 11th in points), Jason Keller (12th), Kelly Bires (13th), Steve Wallace (14th), and Bobby Hamilton Jr. (15th).

See also 
 2008 NASCAR Sprint Cup Series
 2008 NASCAR Craftsman Truck Series
 2008 NASCAR Camping World East Series
 2008 NASCAR Camping World West Series
 2008 NASCAR Corona Series
 2008 NASCAR Canadian Tire Series

References

External links 
  
 NASCAR Nationwide Series home page 

NASCAR Xfinity Series seasons